Bodo Tümmler (born 8 December 1943) is a German former middle-distance runner. He competed for West Germany at the 1968 and 1972 Olympics in the 1500 meter event, and won a bronze medal in 1968.

Biography
Tümmler was born in Thorn, West-Prussia, now Toruń, Poland. He entered the 1968 Olympics as the reigning European Champion. The 1500 m final was run at a fast pace and at the start of the last lap the eventual Olympic Champion Kipchoge Keino had already established a substantial lead. Tümmler and his countryman Harald Norpoth were in second and third place but were outsprinted by the world-record holder Jim Ryun on the last lap.

References

External links

1943 births
Living people
West German male middle-distance runners
Athletes (track and field) at the 1968 Summer Olympics
Athletes (track and field) at the 1972 Summer Olympics
Olympic athletes of West Germany
Olympic bronze medalists for West Germany
People from Toruń
People from West Prussia
European Athletics Championships medalists
Medalists at the 1968 Summer Olympics
Olympic bronze medalists in athletics (track and field)
Universiade medalists in athletics (track and field)
Universiade gold medalists for West Germany
Medalists at the 1965 Summer Universiade
Medalists at the 1967 Summer Universiade